Puncturella pseudanaloga is a minute species of deepwater keyhole limpet, a marine gastropod mollusc or micromollusk in the family Fissurellidae, the keyhole limpets and slit limpets.

Distribution
This species is endemic to Australia's Macquarie Island.

Habitat
This keyhole limpet is found at depths of about 70 m.

References
 Powell A. W. B., New Zealand Mollusca, William Collins Publishers Ltd, Auckland, New Zealand 1979 

Fissurellidae
Gastropods of Australia
Gastropods described in 1957
Taxa named by Arthur William Baden Powell